Chapmania may refer to:
 Chapmania (flatworm), a genus of flatworms in the family Davaineidae
 Chapmania, a genus of foraminifers in the family Chapmaninidae, synonym of Chapmanina
 Chapmania, a genus of beetles in the family Staphylinidae, synonym of Charhyphus
 Chapmania (trilobite), synonym of Chapmanopyge